The Gadfly is a 1980 Soviet drama film directed by Nikolai Mashchenko based on the novel  by Ethel Lilian Voynich. Its screenplay was written by Yuli Dunsky and Valeri Frid.

Plot

Series 1. "Memory" 
Student Arthur Burton, the son of a wealthy English shipowner from Livorno, is fascinated by the idea of uniting Italy into one country and liberating it from the Austrian Habsburgs. Elder brother James and his wife Julia openly dislike Arthur, and the only person close to him is the rector of the seminary, Bishop Montanelli. Due to the circumstances, Arthur is briefly imprisoned, and after leaving there, he experiences a serious quarrel with Gemma. On the same day, he learns from his brother's wife that his father is in fact Montanelli. Arthur decides to go to South America, and pre-simulates his death…

Series 2. "Gemma" 
Many years later, Arthur returned to Italy under the name of Felice Rivares. He is a popular pamphleteer "Ovid", known for his intolerance of ministers of the Catholic Church. Here he meets again with Gemma, who does not recognize him, and he himself does not seek to reveal his secret to her. Despite some controversy, Ovid and Gemma begin preparations for an armed uprising in the Papal States. During one of his business trips, Ovid, disguised as a traveler, meets in the cathedral with his father Montanelli, who has already become a cardinal and is firmly convinced of Arthur's death. Right in the cathedral he was arrested by the guards and sent to prison…

Series 3. "Father and son" 
Friends try to arrange for him to escape from prison, which breaks down due to a sudden exacerbation of chronic Ovod's disease. Montanelli comes to his cell for a spiritual conversation, but Arthur does not want to compromise, constantly showing his hostility to the priest. In the end, he reveals his secret to the cardinal, but refuses to accept help from his father. Ovoda is soon shot, and Montanelli goes mad and dies during a service in the cathedral.

Cast
 Andrey Kharitonov as  Arthur Burton (Felice Rivarez)
 Sergei Bondarchuk as Cardinal Montanelli
 Anastasiya Vertinskaya as Gemma  
 Ada Rogovtseva as Julie Burton
 Konstantin Stepankov as Austrian Colonel
 Kamen Tzanev as Riccardo
 Stefan Dobrev as Giovanni Bolla (voiced by Vitali Doroshenko)
 Givi Tokhadze as Father Cardi
 Kartlos Maradishvili as Giuseppe (voiced by Pavel Morozenko)
 Aleksandr Zadneprovsky as James Burton
 Grigore Grigoriu as  Cesare Martini (voiced by Leonid Filatov)
 Irina Skobtseva as Gladys Burton
 Vladimir Talashko as doctor
 Valeriy Sheptekita as signor Grassini
 Igor Dmitriev as episode

References

External links

1980 films
1980 drama films
1980 in the Soviet Union
1980s Russian-language films
Soviet television films
Films based on Irish novels
Dovzhenko Film Studios films
Films set in the 1840s